The pyrrhuloxia  or desert cardinal (Cardinalis sinuatus) is a medium-sized North American song bird found in the American southwest and northern Mexico. This distinctive species with a short, stout bill and red crest and wings, and closely resembles the northern cardinal and the vermilion cardinal, which are in the same genus.

Taxonomy
The desert cardinal is one of three birds in the genus Cardinalis in the family Cardinalidae, a group of passerine birds found in North and South America.

Its name of pyrrhuloxia – once part of its scientific name – comes from Greek terms describing its coloration (πυρρος =  = reddish or orange) and the shape of its bill (λοξος =  = oblique). The common name, desert cardinal, refers to it inhabiting the southwest, and often arid regions, of the North American continent.

Description
The desert cardinal is a medium-sized song bird; the length for both sexes is about 8.3 in (21 cm), while the typical weight is 0.8–1.5 oz (24–43 g).

The most obvious differences between the male desert cardinal and the northern cardinal are in their coloring. The desert cardinal is predominantly brownish-gray with a red breast, a red mask, and a yellow, parrot-like bill that is stout and rounded. The females of the two species resemble each other much more closely, but the shapes of their bills are diagnostic. The songs of the two species are identical, though the pyrrhuloxia's is not quite as loud. This cardinal retains the distinctive long, pointed, red crest present in all species.

Distribution and habitat
The pyrrhuloxia is a year-round resident of desert scrub and mesquite thickets, in the U.S. states of Arizona, New Mexico, and Texas and woodland edges in Mexico. It occupies the southwestern half of Texas, roughly the southern third of New Mexico, and southeastern region of Arizona. Its range includes areas from the west to east coast of Mexico north of the Sierra Madre del Sur, Trans-Mexican Volcanic Belt, and Isthmus of Tehuantepec, while excluding the Sierra Madre Occidental. An individual of the species has reportedly been seen as far away from its dominant range as Costa Mesa, California, in Orange County.

This cardinal is relatively nonmigratory, though it may occasionally stray slightly north of its usual range. The pyrrhuloxia prefers habitat along stream beds. In areas where the range of the pyrrhuloxia and northern cardinal overlap, hybridization may occur between them.

Ecology
In breeding season, songs are used to establish and defend territories. One song has a sharp, clear, "wha-cheer, wha-cheer", while another is characteristic of a metallic "quink".  Females also sing, but they use softer and duller notes. A short "cheep" or "chip" is a regular contact call given by both sexes while foraging.

Diet
The pyrrhuloxia's diet consists of seeds, fruits, and insects. While foraging, the desert cardinal snatches insects from trees and picks seeds predominantly from the stalks of grasses and similar plants. It also seeks out cactus fruit for consumption. This bird is a benefit to cotton fields, as it assists in eating populations of cotton worms and weevils. This species of cardinal also visits bird feeders and in the winter forages in huge flocks, sometimes numbering in the thousands.

Reproduction
The breeding season for this cardinal usually begins in mid-March, ending in mid-August. As the breeding season approaches, territories are established and defended by the male. The male defends the territory by chasing away intruders and from a good vantage point, singing. Where both the desert and northern cardinal breeding territories overlap, no interspecific conflicts have been observed.

The desert cardinal places its nest in dense shrub, often concealed. The nest is small and forms a bowl or cup-like shape made up of grass, twigs, or bits of tree bark. Clutches of two to four eggs are most common, while the eggs are whitish with specks of green or gray. During an incubation period of two weeks, the male brings food to the female. At hatching, the chicks are helpless and have a bright yellow bill with red lining around the mouth. The chicks fledge around 10 days old, while both the male and female tend to the young. The young bird can wait for up to a month before fully fledging, becoming independent and feeding in large flocks. During this period, the bird achieves complete growth.

Relationship with humans
As large areas of the pyrrhuloxia's habitat in its northern range have been lost to humans, unlike with the northern cardinal, the former's populations appear to be in a slight decline.

Photo gallery

References

External links

Pyrrhuloxia videos on the Internet Bird Collection
Pyrrhuloxia photo gallery VIREO
Pyrrhuloxia photo gallery at Greg Lasley nature photography

Cardinalis
Native birds of the Southwestern United States
Birds of the Rio Grande valleys
Birds of Mexico
Fauna of the Chihuahuan Desert
Birds described in 1838
Taxa named by Charles Lucien Bonaparte